5th Yeomanry Mounted Brigade may refer to:
 Yeomanry Mounted Brigade which was numbered 5th Mounted Brigade while attached to 2nd Mounted Division
 1st South Midland Mounted Brigade which was renumbered as 5th Mounted Brigade on 20 April 1916